Aneke is a Nigerian surname. Notable people with this name include:

 Jude Aneke, Nigerian footballer
 Aneke Divinefavour, Software developer
 Chuks Aneke, English footballer
 Chjioke Aneke
 James N.J. Aneke
 Chidinma and Chidiebere Aneke

See also
 Nwagu Aneke script
 Anneke

Surnames of Nigerian origin